The year 560 BC was a year of the pre-Julian Roman calendar. In the Roman Empire, it was known as year 194 Ab urbe condita. 
The denomination 560 BC for this year has been used since the early medieval period, when the Anno Domini calendar era became the prevalent method in Europe for naming years.

Events
 Peisistratus seizes the Acropolis in Athens, becoming the city's tyrant for the first time.
 Calf bearer (Moscophoros), from the Acropolis, Athens is made. It is now displayed at the Acropolis Museum, Athens (approximate date).
 Berlin Kore, begun in 570 BC, is finished. It is now displayed in Germany.

Births
 Phocylides, Greek gnomic poet from Miletus

Deaths
 Amel-Marduk, king of Babylon
 Battus II of Cyrene, Greek king of Cyrene and Cyrenaica
 King Gong of Chu, Chinese king of Chu
 Leon of Sparta, king of Sparta

Notes

References